The 2013 VCU Rams baseball team will be the 43rd season of the university fielding a varsity baseball program, and will represent Virginia Commonwealth University in the 2013 NCAA Division I baseball season. The Rams will be playing their inaugural season in the Atlantic 10 Conference.

It will be the first season of Shawn Stiffler as manager for the program. It was previously led by Paul Keyes for the past 18 season. Keyes died of cancer in the summer of 2012.

Personnel

2013 roster

Schedule 

! style="background:#000;color:#f8b800;"| Regular Season
|- valign="top" 

|- bgcolor="#ccffcc"
| 1 || 02/15/13 || vs. (Elon Invitational) || Latham Park || 4–1 || M. Lees (1–0) || J. Burke (0–1) || none || 200 || 1–0 || —
|-  style="text-align:center; background:#d3d3d3;"
| — || 02/16/13 || vs. (Elon Invitational) || Latham Park ||colspan=5|Postponed || 1–0 || —
|-  style="text-align:center; background:#ccffcc"
| 2 || 02/17/13 || @ (Elon Invitational) || Latham Park || 6–2 || R. Ferrar (1–0) || D. Whitehead (0-1) || J. Weymouth (1) || 256 || 2–0 || —
|-  style="text-align:center; background:#ccffcc"
| 3 || 02/22/13 ||  || The Diamond || 1–0 || H. Dwyer (2–0) || K. Mullen (1–1) || M. Lees (2) || 222 || 3–0 || 1–0
|-  style="text-align:center; background:#ccffcc"
| 4 || 02/23/13 || Saint Joseph's || The Diamond || 3–2 || L. Kanuik (1-0) || K. Burum (1-1) || M. Lees (3) || 210 || 4-0 || 0-0
|-  style="text-align:center; background:#ccffcc"
| 5 || 02/24/13 || Saint Joseph's || The Diamond || 2–0 || R. Farrar (2-0) || D. Thorpe (0-1) || S. Greene (1) || 310 || 5-0 || 0-0
|-  style="text-align:center; background:#d3d3d3;"
| — || 02/26/13 || @  || Clark–LeClair Stadium ||colspan=5|Postponed || 5–0 || —
|-

|-  style="text-align:center; background:#ccffcc;"
| 6 || 03/01/13 || vs. (Charleston Crab House Shootout) || Riley Park || 12-1 || H. Dwyer (3-0) || D. Roland (0-3)|| none ||  125 || 6-0|| 0-0
|-  style="text-align:center; background:#ccffcc"
| 7 || 03/02/13 || @ The Citadel(Charleston Crab House Shootout) || Riley Jr. Park || 11-6 || T. Buckley (1-0) || J. Reeves (1-1) ||none||  240|| 7-0 || 0-0
|-  style="text-align:center; background:#ccffcc"
| 8 || 03/03/13 || vs. (Charleston Crab House Shootout) || Riley Jr. Park ||6-4|| R. Farrar (3-0) || A. Belfiglio (0-1) || M. Lees (5) ||  150 || 8-0 || 0-0
|-  style="text-align:center; background:#ccffcc"
| 9 || 03/05/13 ||  || The Diamond || 4-2 ||T. Marino (1-0) || T. Love (0-1) || M. Lees(6)  ||  176 || 9-0 || 0-0
|- align="center" bgcolor="#ffbbb"
| 10 || 03/08/13 || at  || Brooks Field || 3-9 || M. Batts (2-0)  || H. Dwyer (3-1) || None || 713 || 9-1 || 0-0
|- align="center" bgcolor="#ffbbb"
| 11 || 03/09/13 || at UNC Wilmington || Brooks Field || 2-7 || J. Ramsey (1-2)|| T. Buckley (1-1) || None || 976 || 9-2 || 0-0
|- align="center" bgcolor="#ffbbb"
| 12 || 03/10/13 || at UNC Wilmington || Brooks Field || 2-3 ||  MacDonald (2-0)  || R. Farrar (3-1) || Livengood (1) || 1,037 || 9-3 || 0-0
|-  style="text-align:center; background:#ccffcc"
| 13 || 03/11/13 ||  || The Diamond || 11-8|| S. Greene (1-0)  || C. Smith (0-2)|| None || 210 || 10-3 || 0-0
|- align="center" bgcolor="#ffbbb"
| 14 || 03/15/13 ||  || The Diamond || 1-3 || McGee (2-0) || H. Dwyer (3-2) || None ||  255 || 10-4|| 0-0
|-  style="text-align:center; background:#ccffcc"
| 15 || 03/16/13 || Monmouth || The Diamond || 8-3 || T. Buckley (2-1)  || Smith (0-3) || S. Greene(2)||  250 || 11-4 || 0-0
|- align="center" bgcolor="#ffbbb"
| 16 || 03/17/13 || Monmouth || The Diamond || 1-7 || Yunginger (2-0)  || R. Farrar (3-2) || Hunt(1) ||  199 || 11-5 || 0-0
|-  style="text-align:center; background:#ccffcc;"
| 17 || 03/19/13 ||  || The Diamond || 4-3 || M. Lees (1-0)  || Brey (1-1) || None|| 237 || 12-5 || 0-0
|- align="center" bgcolor="#ffbbb"
| 18 || 03/20/13 || Rutgers || The Diamond || 6-9 || Corsi (2-3) || L. Kanuik (1-1)|| None ||  227 || 12-6 || 0-0
|- align="center" bgcolor="#ffbbb"
| 19 || 03/22/13 || * || The Diamond || 4-6 || Stout  (4-2)  || H. Dwyer (3-3) || BYERLY(2) ||  214 || 12-7 || 0-1
|- align="center" bgcolor="#ffbbb"
| 20 || 03/23/13 || Butler* || The Diamond || 3-4 || Kramp (5-0)  || R. Farrar (3-3) || Byerly(3) || 222 || 12-8 || 0-2
|- align="center" bgcolor="#ffbbb"
| 21 || 03/23/13 ||  Butler* || The Diamond || 4-7|| Laing (1-1)  || S. Greene (1-1) || Byerly(4) ||  299 || 12-9 || 0-3
|- align="center" bgcolor="#ffbbb"
| 22 || 03/26/13 ||  at #1 North Carolina || Boshamer Stadium || 2-3 || C. McCue (5-0)  || M. Lees (1-1) || None ||  365 || 12-10 || 0-3
|- bgcolor="#ccffcc"
| 23 || 03/29/13 ||  at * || Hayes Stadium || 5-2 || H. Dwyer (4-3)  || T. Barnette (1-2) || None ||  1,089 || 13-10 || 1-3
|- align="center" bgcolor="#ffbbb"
| 24 || 03/30/13 ||  at Charlotte* || Hayes Stadium || 8-9 || J. Hudson (2-0)  || M. Lees (1-2) || None ||  1,141 || 13-11 || 1-4
|- bgcolor="#ccffcc"
| 25 || 03/30/13 ||  at Charlotte* || Hayes Stadium || 4-3 || L. Kanuik (2-1)  || S. Geohegan (1-1) || None ||  1,148 || 14-11 || 2-4
|-

|- align="center" bgcolor="#ffbbb"
| 26 || 04/02/13 || at Virginia Tech || English Field || 5-11 || J. Joyce (4-1)  || D. Black (0-1)  || None  || 1,042  || 14-12  || 2-4
|- align="center" bgcolor="#ffbbb"
| 27 || 04/05/13 || at  || Gray–Minor Stadium || 2-6 || C. Bach (2-2) || H. Dwyer (4-4)  || None  || 187 || 14-13  || 2-4
|- align="center" bgcolor="#ffbbb"
| 28 || 04/06/13 || at VMI || Gray–Minor Stadium || 4-5 || J. Garrett (2-2)  || M. Lees (1-3)  || None  || 234 || 14-14 || 2-4
|- bgcolor="#ccffcc"
| 29 || 04/07/13 || at VMI || Gray–Minor Stadium || 8-4 || L. Kanuik (3-1)  || J. Brown (3-1)  || None  || 222 || 15-14 || 2-4
|- align="center" bgcolor="#ffbbb"
| 30 || 04/09/13 || at  || Shipley Field || 5-6 || B. Casas (2-0) || A. Absher (0-1) || None  || 357 || 15-15 || 2-4
|- bgcolor="#ccffcc"
| 31 || 04/12/13 || * || The Diamond || 2-1 ||M. Lees (2-3)'   || P. Peterson (1-4)  || None  || 335 || 16-15 || 3-4
|- align="center" bgcolor="#ffbbb"
| 32 || 04/13/13 || Temple* || The Diamond || 1-5 || E. Peterson (5-0)  || R. Farrar (4-4) || None || 340 || 16-16 || 3-5
|- align="center" bgcolor=""
| 33 || 04/14/13 || Temple* || The Diamond || ||   ||   ||   ||  ||  ||
|- align="center" bgcolor=""
| 34 || 04/16/13 || Maryland || The Diamond || ||   ||   ||   ||  ||  ||
|- align="center" bgcolor=""
| 35 || 04/17/13 || VMI || The Diamond || ||   ||   ||   ||  ||  ||
|- align="center" bgcolor=""
| 36 || 04/19/13 || at * || Woerner Field || ||   ||   ||   ||  ||  ||
|- align="center" bgcolor=""
| 37 || 04/20/13 || at Dayton* || Woerner Field || ||   ||   ||   ||  ||  ||
|- align="center" bgcolor=""
| 38 || 04/21/13 || at Dayton* || Woerner Field || ||   ||   ||   ||  ||  ||
|- align="center" bgcolor=""
| 39 || 04/23/13 || at Old Dominion(Hampton Classic'') || War Memorial Stadium || ||   ||   ||   ||  ||  ||
|- align="center" bgcolor=""
| 40 || 04/26/13 || at * || DeVincent Field || ||   ||   ||   ||  ||  ||
|- align="center" bgcolor=""
| 41 || 04/27/13 || at La Salle* || DeVincent Field || ||   ||   ||   ||  ||  ||
|- align="center" bgcolor=""
| 42 || 04/28/13 || at La Salle* || DeVincent Field || ||   ||   ||   ||  ||  ||
|- align="center" bgcolor=""
| 43 || 04/30/13 || #7 Virginia || The Diamond || ||   ||   ||   ||  ||  ||
|-

|- align="center" bgcolor=""
| 44 || 05/04/13 || * || The Diamond || ||   ||   ||   ||  || || 
|- align="center" bgcolor=""
| 45 || 05/05/13 || Saint Louis* || The Diamond || ||   ||   ||   ||  || || 
|- align="center" bgcolor=""
| 46 || 05/05/13 || Saint Louis* || The Diamond || ||   ||   ||   ||  || || 
|- align="center" bgcolor=""
| 47 || 05/08/13 || at Maryland || Shipley Field || ||   ||   ||   ||  || || 
|- align="center" bgcolor=""
| 48 || 05/10/13 || at * || Barcroft Park || ||   ||   ||   ||  || || 
|- align="center" bgcolor=""
| 49 || 05/11/13 || at George Washington* || Barcroft Park || ||   ||   ||   ||  || || 
|- align="center" bgcolor=""
| 50 || 05/12/13 || at George Washington* || Barcroft Park || ||   ||   ||   ||  || || 
|- align="center" bgcolor=""
| 51 || 05/14/13 || at Virginia || Davenport Field || ||   ||   ||   ||  || || 
|- align="center" bgcolor=""
| 52 || 05/16/13 || Richmond* || The Diamond || ||   ||   ||   ||  || || 
|- align="center" bgcolor=""
| 53 || 05/17/13 || Richmond* || The Diamond || ||   ||   ||   ||  || || 
|- align="center" bgcolor=""
| 54 || 05/18/13 || Richmond* || The Diamond || ||   ||   ||   ||  || || 
|-

|-  style="text-align:center; background:#fff;"
| 55 || 05/22/13 ||  TBD || Hayes Stadium ||  ||  ||  ||  ||  || – || –
|-  style="text-align:center; background:#fff;"
| 56 || 05/23/13 ||  TBD || Hayes Stadium ||  ||  ||  ||  ||  || – || –
|-  style="text-align:center; background:#fff;"
| 57 || 05/24/13 ||  TBD || Hayes Stadium ||  ||  ||  ||  ||  || – || –
|-  style="text-align:center; background:#fff;"
| 58 || 05/25/13 ||  TBD || Hayes Stadium ||  ||  ||  ||  ||  || – || –
|-

|-
| 
|-
| style="font-size:88%"|  * A-10 conference games.

Rankings

See also 
 VCU Rams
 VCU Rams baseball
 2013 NCAA Division I baseball season

References 

Vcu
VCU Rams baseball seasons
VCU Rams